Gevheri Kadın ("gem"; 8 July 1856 – 6 September 1884), born Emine Hanim, was a consort of Sultan Abdulaziz of the Ottoman Empire.

Life
Gevheri Kadın was born on 8 July 1856. She was Abkhazian, daughter of Salih Bey and Şaziye Hanim, prince Tsanba Osman Bey's daughter, and her real name was Emine Hanim. She was sent to the palace as a child and educated to become a consort by Pertevniyal Sultan, Abdülaziz's mother. She married Abdulaziz in 1872 in the Dolmabahçe Palace, and was given the title of "Senior Ikbal". A year after the marriage, on 21 March 1873, she gave birth to her first child, a daughter, Esma Sultan. On 22 September 1874, she gave birth to her second child, a son, Şehzade Mehmed Seyfeddin in the Çırağan Palace. Sometime later she was elevated to the title of "Fifth Kadın", and in 1875, to the title of "Fourth Kadın".  She had long curly auburn hair and blue eyes. She always wore white dresses with a red sash at the waist and a light blue veil hotoz on her head; her only jewelry were the rings Abdülaziz gave her on their wedding day. Gevheri was a very charitable women: she helped the poor however she could, paid for the education of young orphans and even supplied funds to repair several mosques and schools.

Abdulaziz was deposed by his ministers on 30 May 1876, his nephew Murad V became the Sultan. He was transferred to Feriye Palace the next day. Gevheri, and other women Abdulaziz's entourage didn't wanted to leave the Dolmabahçe Palace. So they were grabbed by hand and were send out to the Feriye Palace. In the process, they were searched from head to toe and everything of value was taken from them. On 4 June 1876, Abdulaziz died under mysterious circumstances.

Death
Gevheri and the other wives were released from captivity by Abdulhamid II in September 1876. She then lived with her children with Şehzade Yusuf Izzedin and later in the Ortaköy Palace.

Gevheri died on 6 September 1884 in the Feriye Palace, Ortaköy at the age of twenty-eight, and was buried in the mausoleum of the imperial ladies at the New Mosque Istanbul.

Issue

See also
Kadın (title)
Ottoman Imperial Harem
List of consorts of the Ottoman sultans

References

Sources

 
 
 

1856 births
1884 deaths
19th-century consorts of Ottoman sultans
People from the Ottoman Empire of Abkhazian descent